João Manuel Silva Monteiro (born 7 May 2001) is a Portuguese professional footballer who plays for Académico de Viseu.

Club career 
Having started his football in Santa Marinha, Vila Nova de Gaia, Monteiro joined Benfica in 2013, where he signed his first professional contract in 2017. He was later transferred to Belenenses SAD in July 2019.

On 27 November 2021, as a COVID-19-hit Belenenses SAD were forced to name a team of just nine players for the Primeira Liga home game against Benfica, Monteiro made his professional debut as an outfield player, with Álvaro Ramalho playing as the goalkeeper. The encounter led to a 7–0 lead for Benfica at half time, before the game was eventually stopped during the break, as Monteiro was injured.

On 28 June 2022, Monteiro signed a two-year contract with Académico de Viseu.

International career 
João Monteiro is a youth international for Portugal.

References

External links

2001 births
Sportspeople from Vila Nova de Gaia
Living people
Portuguese footballers
Portugal youth international footballers
Association football goalkeepers
Belenenses SAD players
Académico de Viseu F.C. players
Primeira Liga players
Campeonato de Portugal (league) players